Callulops robustus (commonly known as Boulenger's callulops frog or robust frog) is a species of frog in the family Microhylidae. It has traditionally been considered as wide-ranging species found in both Western New Guinea (Indonesia) and Papua New Guinea. However, it is likely that specimens from the type locality, Misima Island, and New Guinea represent different species. If so, name Callulops robustus belongs to the Misima Island species, and the mainland species is unnamed. Other island populations may or may not belong to Callulops robustus. Callulops microtis from the mainland has already been removed from synonymy with Callulops robustus.

Description
Snout is long. Adults are reddish-brown or grey brown above. Chin, chest, and under limbs are dark purple brown. Colouration in juveniles is quite different: with black head and limbs, brick-red dorsum and sides, with scattered minute blue-white flecks.

Habitat and conservation
Callulops robustus is widespread species (see, however, the caveat on species identity) but occurs at relatively low densities. It occurs in lowland and hill rainforests and also in modified or disturbed habitats (degraded forests and forest edges, rural gardens, and near landslides) at elevations of up to  asl. It burrows in the forest floor and breeds by direct development. There are no significant threats to this species.

References

robustus
Amphibians of Western New Guinea
Amphibians of Papua New Guinea
Amphibians described in 1898
Taxa named by George Albert Boulenger
Taxonomy articles created by Polbot